Steve Runge (born June 12, 1968) is an American college golf coach and former professional golfer.

Runge was born in Newport Beach, California. He played college golf at Ohio State University. He turned professional in 1992.

Runge played on the Nationwide Tour from NT 1995 to 1996 and 2000 to 2006. He won once at the 2000 Buy.com Richmond Open. He also played various mini-tours during his career.

After his playing career was over, Runge worked as a golf instructor at IMG Academy in Bradenton, Florida. In August 2011, he was hired as the men's golf coach at Clayton State University in Morrow, Georgia. In August 2014, he became the head coach at the University of Central Arkansas.

Professional wins (3)

Buy.com Tour wins (1)

Buy.com Tour playoff record (1–0)

Other wins (2)
1997 Utah Open
2001 Panama Open

References

External links

American male golfers
Ohio State Buckeyes men's golfers
PGA Tour golfers
American golf instructors
Golfers from California
Golfers from Florida
Clayton State Lakers men's golf coaches
Central Arkansas Bears golf coaches
Sportspeople from Newport Beach, California
People from Valrico, Florida
People from Morrow, Georgia
Sportspeople from the Atlanta metropolitan area
1968 births
Living people